Galeh Yar (also Romanized as Galeh Yār, Galīār, Gelīār, and Geleyār) is a village in Zaz-e Sharqi Rural District, Zaz va Mahru District, Aligudarz County, Lorestan Province, Iran. At the 2006 census, its population was 260, in 50 families.

References

Towns and villages in Aligudarz County